Turn Of My Century is the first solo album by Greek guitarist and keyboardist Bob Katsionis. It was released in 2002 under the label Lion Music. Katsionis is currently in the band Firewind. It was rereleased in Japan in 2004 with new cover art and a bonus video.

Track listing
 "Turn Of My Century" – 3:02
 "Planetarium" – 4:32
 "Cosmic" – 3:50
 "Omega" – 3:41
 "Windows To The World" – 4:11
 "My Strange Girl" – 4:30
 "Forbidden Erotica" – 2:07
 "Song Of The East" – 3:23
 "Exploration" – 3:48
 "Enhanced Fear" – 4:04
 "Automatic World Science" – 3:28
 "Face The Undead" – 2:47
 "Sapphire" – 1:52
 "Enemy's Adagio" – 2:49
 "Flight Of the Pink Dragon" – 3:20
 "Cold Pale Skin" – 3:37
 "Scary Groove" – 2:58

Personnel
Bob Katsionis - keyboards, 7 string guitar
Fotis Benardo - drums
Steve Benardo - bass

References

2002 albums